Chiti (also Romanized as Chītī; also known as Qal‘eh Chetī and Qal‘eh Chītī) is a village in Sadat Rural District, in the Central District of Lali County, Khuzestan Province, Iran. At the 2006 census, its population was 97, in 14 families.

References 

Populated places in Lali County